Bovines (subfamily Bovinae) comprise a diverse group of 10 genera of medium to large-sized ungulates, including cattle, bison, African buffalo, water buffalos, and the four-horned and spiral-horned antelopes. The evolutionary relationship between the members of the group is still debated, and their classification into loose tribes rather than formal subgroups reflects this uncertainty. General characteristics include cloven hooves and usually at least one of the sexes of a species having true horns. The largest extant bovine is the gaur.

In many countries, bovid milk and meat is used as food by humans. Cattle are kept as livestock almost everywhere except in parts of India and Nepal, where they are considered sacred by most Hindus. Bovids are used as draft animals and as riding animals. Small breeds of domestic bovid, such as the Miniature Zebu, are kept as pets. Bovid leather is durable and flexible and is used to produce a wide range of goods including clothing and bags.

Systematics and classification

 Family Bovidae
 Subfamily Bovinae
 Tribe Boselaphini
 Genus Tetracerus
Four-horned antelope, Tetracerus quadricornis
T. q. quadricornis
T. q. iodes
T. q. subquadricornis
 Genus Boselaphus
Nilgai, Boselaphus tragocamelus
B. t. tragocamelus (Indian nilgai)
 Genus †Duboisia
†D. santeng
 Tribe Bovini
 Genus Bubalus
Wild water buffalo, Bubalus arnee
Domestic water buffalo, Bubalus bubalis
Lowland anoa, Bubalus depressicornis
 Mountain anoa, Bubalus quarlesi
Tamaraw, Bubalus mindorensis
Cebu tamaraw†, Bubalus cebuensis 
 Genus Bos
 Aurochs, Bos primigenius
 Eurasian aurochs†, B. p. primigenius
 Indian aurochs†, B. p. namadicus
 Banteng, Bos javanicus
 Gaur, Bos gaurus
 Gayal, Bos frontalis
 Domestic yak, Bos grunniens
 Wild yak, Bos mutus
 Bos palaesondaicus†, 
 Kouprey, Bos sauveli (possibly extinct)
 Domestic cattle, Bos taurus
 Taurine cattle, B. t. taurus
 Zebu cattle, B. t. indicus
 Sanga cattle, B. t. africanus
 Genus Pseudoryx
 Saola, Pseudoryx nghetinhensis
 Genus Syncerus
 African buffalo, Syncerus caffer
 Cape buffalo, S. c. caffer
 Nile buffalo, S. c. aequinoctialis
 Sudan buffalo, S. c. brachyceros
 Forest buffalo, S. c. nanus
 Giant buffalo, Syncerus antiquus†
 Genus Bison
 American bison, Bison bison
 Wood bison, B. b. athabascae
 Plains bison, B. b. bison
 European bison, Bison bonasus
 Bison palaeosinensis†, (extinct)
 Steppe wisent†, Bison priscus 
 Ancient bison†, Bison antiquus 
 Long-horned bison†, Bison latifrons 
 Genus Pelorovis† (extinct)
 Pelorovis oldowayensis†
 Pelorovis turkanensis†
 Pelorovis kaisensis†
 Pelorovis howelli†
 Tribe Tragelaphini
 Genus Tragelaphus (antelope-like)
 Bongo, Tragelaphus eurycerusT. e. isaaciT. e. eurycerus Greater kudu, Tragelaphus strepsicerosT. s. strepsicerosT. s. choraT. s. cottoni Cape bushbuck, Tragelaphus scriptus Harnessed bushbuck, Tragelaphus sylvaticus Lesser kudu, Tragelaphus imberbis Mountain nyala, Tragelaphus buxtoni Lowland nyala, Tragelaphus angasii Sitatunga, Tragelaphus spekeiiT. s. selousiT. s. gratusT. s. spekii Genus Taurotragus Common eland, Taurotragus oryxT. o. oryxT. o. livingstoniiT. o. pattersonianus Giant eland, Taurotragus derbianusT. d. derbianusT. d. gigasEtymology
Bovine is derived from Latin bos, "ox", through Late Latin bovinus. Bos comes from the Indo-European root *gwous, meaning ox.

References

 International Commission on Zoological Nomenclature (2003) Opinion 2027 (Case 3010). Usage of 17 specific names based on wild species which are pre-dated by or contemporary with those based on domestic animals (Lepidoptera, Osteichthyes, Mammalia): conserved. Bull. Zool. Nomencl''., 60:81–84.

External links

 Bovinae information in ITIS.
 Congress on Controversies in Bovine Health, Industry & Economics (CoBo)

 
Bovidae
Taxa named by John Edward Gray
Mammal subfamilies
Extant Miocene first appearances